Lakhdar Brahimi (born 1 January 1934) is an Algerian United Nations diplomat who served as the United Nations and Arab League Special Envoy to Syria until 14 May 2014. He was Minister of Foreign Affairs of Algeria from 1991 to 1993.  He served as chairman of the United Nations Panel on United Nations Peace Operations in 2000.  Its highly influential report "Report of the Panel on United Nations Peacekeeping" is known as "The Brahimi Report".

He is also a member of The Elders, a group of world leaders working for global peace. Brahimi is a member of the Commission on Legal Empowerment of the Poor, the first global initiative to focus specifically on the link between exclusion, poverty and law. He has also been a Member of the Global Leadership Foundation since 2008, an organization which works to promote good governance around the world. He is currently a distinguished senior fellow at the Centre for the Study of Global Governance at the London School of Economics and Political Science, and a governing board member of the Stockholm International Peace Research Institute. He relinquished his post as UN Special Envoy to Syria on 31 May 2014.

Early life and education
Brahimi was born in 1934 in El Azizia near Tablat, Algeria, about 60 km south of Algiers. He was educated in Algeria and in France where he studied law and political science. He joined the campaign for independence in 1956. Based in Jakarta for five years, he was the representative of the National Liberation Front (Algeria) in South East Asia, touring the region in search of diplomatic support.

Career

Brahimi was the United Nations special representative for Afghanistan and Iraq. Before his appointment in 2001 by the Secretary-General, Kofi Annan, he had served the U.N. as special representative to Haiti where he narrowly escaped an assassination attempt. Brahimi facilitated the first American UN Force Commander since their involvement in the Korean War. Before coming to the U.N., Brahimi, who represented the National Liberation Front in Tunis during Algeria's independence movement in 1956–1961, was an Arab League official (1984–1991) and the Algerian Minister for Foreign Affairs from 1991 until 1993. Brahimi was also chair of the Panel on United Nations Peace Operations, which produced the influential Brahimi Report.

On a visit to Baghdad in April 2004 to help determine how and when Iraqi elections can be held, he said that the recent violence threatened to delay Iraqi national assembly elections—the national assembly is to pick the president and write a constitution.

 "The elections scheduled to take place in January 2005 are the most important milestone," Brahimi said. "There is no substitute for the legitimacy that comes from free and fair elections." (Witter, 2004)

Brahimi suggested that the Iraq Interim Governing Council should be dissolved, and that most of its members should not have any role in the new government. Though the council was in fact dissolved early, some of its members did have major roles in the ensuing government. The president, one of the two vice-presidents, and the prime minister in the following government all served on the council. Most prominently, Brahimi's criticism of Ahmed Chalabi has led to Chalabi's claim that Brahimi is an Arab nationalist who should have no role in determining the future of Iraq. At the same time, close allies of Chalabi have been pushing claims that various world leaders and the UN took bribes from Saddam Hussein under the Oil for Food program.

In May 2004, Brahimi was supposed to play a large advisory role in the appointment of candidates, which ended up selecting as Iraq's new interim President and Prime Minister: Ghazi Mashal Ajil al-Yawer and Iyad Allawi, respectively. However, Brahimi expressed serious disappointment and frustration about his role. "Bremer is the dictator of Iraq, He has the money. He has the signature. ... I will not say who was my first choice, and who was not my first choice ... I will remind you that the Americans are governing this country." According to a person who spoke with him, "He was very disappointed, very frustrated," al Dulame said. "I asked him why he didn't say that publicly (and) he said, 'I am the U.N. envoy to Iraq, how can I admit to failure?'" Brahimi announced his resignation, resulting from "great difficulties and frustration experienced during his assignment in Iraq", at the UN in New York on 12 June. While serving as the United Nations envoy to Iraq, he described Israel's policy towards the Palestinians as "the big poison in the region".

On 5 February 2008, the UN Secretary-General, Ban Ki Moon, appointed Brahimi to lead a panel investigation on United Nations staff security in the wake of the Algiers bombings of 11 December 2007. He was one of the founders of the French language Journal of Palestine Studies called La revue d'étude palestinienne.

On 17 August 2012, Brahimi was appointed by the United Nations as the new peace envoy to Syria, replacing Kofi Annan.

On 13 May 2014, UN Secretary General Ban Ki Moon announced that Brahimi would resign as the special envoy to Syria on 31 May 2014.

Brahimi addressed a police academy in December 2016, expressing his wish that Algeria and Morocco should “leave the Sahara issue aside in an effort to build a communal economy based on exchange.” His statement caused shockwaves in Algeria.

In March 2019, he is mandated by Abdelaziz Bouteflika to preside over the national conference that is to propose a new constitution and set the date of the presidential election.

Career history

National Liberation Front Representative to Indonesia: 1956–1961
Ambassador to Egypt, Sudan and the Arab League: 1963–1970
Ambassador to the United Kingdom: 1971–1979
Diplomatic Adviser to the President: 1982–1984
Undersecretary General of the Arab League: 1984–1991
Arab League Special Envoy for Lebanon: 1989–1991
Foreign Minister of Algeria: 5 June 1991 – 3 February 1993
Rapporteur to the Earth Summit: 3 June 1992 – 14 June 1992
United Nations Special Envoy for South Africa: December 1993 – June 1994
United Nations Special Envoy for Haiti: 1994–1996
From 1996-1997, he also undertook a series of special missions to Zaire, Cameroon, Yemen, Burundi, Angola, Liberia, Nigeria, Sudan and Cote d'Ivoire on behalf of the United Nations.
United Nations Special Envoy for Afghanistan: July 1997 – October 1999
Chairperson of the Independent Panel on United Nations Peace Operations: 7 March 2000 – 17 August 2000
United Nations Special Envoy for Afghanistan: 3 October 2001 – 31 December 2004
Chairperson of the Bonn Conference: 24 November 2001 – 5 December 2001
Special Adviser and Undersecretary General of the United Nations: 2004–2005
United Nations Special Envoy for Iraq: 1 January 2004 – 12 June 2004
Visiting Professor of the Institute for Advanced Study: 2006–2008
Member of The Elders: 2007–present
Chairperson of the Independent Panel on Safety and Security of United Nations Personnel and Premises Worldwide: 5 February 2008 – 9 June 2008
United Nations and Arab League Special Envoy for Syria: 2012–2014

Honours and awards

Honours

Awards

 2016 : Human Rights Prize of the National Consultative Commission for the Promotion and Protection of Human Rights (France)
 2016 : Emir Abdelkader Prize for Living Together
 2014 : Wateler Peace Prize
 2011 : Laureate of the Special Jury Prize for Conflict Prevention laureate of the Special Jury Prize awarded by the Fondation Chirac
 2008 : Four Freedoms Award
 2006 : Hesse Peace Prize
 2004 : Dag Hammarskjöld Medal of Honor

Honorary degrees
 2018 : Waseda University
 2017 : University of Ottawa
 2017 : University of Algiers
 2016 : Sciences Po

Personal life

Brahimi is fluent in Arabic, French and English.

He is married to Mila Bacic Brahimi, and has three children: Salah Brahimi is the CEO of Grey Matter International, a consultant company, located in Washington, DC, where he lives with his wife, Dr. Doaa Taha, and his two children; Princess Rym al-Ali, who was a CNN correspondent in Baghdad during the 2003 Iraq War, is married to Prince Ali bin Hussein. She lives in Amman, Jordan, with her husband and two children, Jalila and Abdullah ibn Ali; and Salem Brahimi, who lives in Paris, France, just a block away from his parents, with his wife Lawrence Brahimi, and his two children.

Published works
 Afghanistan: Negotiating Peace, New York, The Century Foundation Press, 2012. 
 Arab–Israeli conflict (collectif work), Beirut, American University of Beirut, 2010.
 Guerres d'Aujourd'hui : Pourquoi ces conflits ? Peut on les résoudre ? (collectif work), Paris, Delavilla, 2008.
 Étude d'ensemble de toute la question des opérations de maintien de la paix sous tous leurs aspects, New York, Nations Unis, 2003. 
 Rapport du Groupe d'étude sur les opérations de paix de l'ONU, New York, Nations Unis, 2000.

References

External links

 

|-

1934 births
Living people
People from Médéa Province
Algerian officials of the United Nations
Center for Contemporary Arab Studies faculty
Foreign ministers of Algeria
Members of the National Liberation Front (Algeria)
Algerian Muslims
Ambassadors of Algeria to Egypt
Ambassadors of Algeria to Sudan
Ambassadors of Algeria to the United Kingdom
Government ministers of Algeria
People involved in the Syrian peace process
Recipients of the Four Freedoms Award
Commandeurs of the Légion d'honneur
Special Representatives of the Secretary-General of the United Nations
Special Envoys of the Secretary-General of the United Nations